Neil James Longhurst (born 21 November 1984) is an English cricketer.  Longhurst is a left-handed batsman who bowls right-arm medium-fast.  He was born in Rotherham, Yorkshire.

While studying for his degree at Durham University, Longhurst made his first-class debut for Durham UCCE against Northamptonshire in 2004.  He made a further first-class appearance in 2004, against Derbyshire.  In his two first-class matches, he scored 61 runs at an average of 20.33, with a high score of 29.

References

External links
Neil Longhurst at ESPNcricinfo

1984 births
Living people
Cricketers from Rotherham
Alumni of Durham University
English cricketers
Durham MCCU cricketers
Cumberland cricketers
English cricketers of the 21st century